Major General Janak Singh (surname Katoch) CIE, OBI, (7 August 1872 – 15 March 1972) was an officer of the Jammu and Kashmir State Forces in the princely state of Jammu and Kashmir. After retirement, he briefly served as the prime minister of the state during a crucial period in 1947, which was evidently a temporary appointment while the Maharaja looked for a more permanent candidate.

Biography
Janak Singh was from the village of Khaira in the Kangra district, in the present-day state of Himachal Pradesh in India.

Military career

Political career 
Singh was army minister in the government of Maharaja Hari Singh of Jammu and Kashmir during 1929–1931. He also served as the revenue minister. On 11 August 1947 he was brought out of retirement to be the prime minister at a turbulent time on the eve of the independence of India and Pakistan. This is deemed to be a temporary appointment while the Maharaja searched for a more permanent replacement.

He steered the Standstill Agreement that Kashmir wanted to sign with India and Pakistan. The agreement was not signed by India, and before further deliberations were done Pakistan-assisted raiders had marched into Kashmir state. Janak Singh was replaced by Mehr Chand Mahajan on 15 October 1947. On 13 September 1947 Maharaja Hari Singh requested the loan of the services of Lt. Col. Kashmir Singh Katoch (son of Janak Singh) to act as the military adviser to the Maharaja. This request was granted by the Indian government.

Honours 

Singh had won a Military Cross with a unit of the Frontier Force Rifles during World War II in action in Italy. He ultimately retired as a Lt. General in the Indian Army. The other two sons also served in the Indian Army, one in the 5 Gorkha Rifles, Brigadier Devendra Singh Katoch, AVSM, and the youngest, Lt. Colonel Rajendra Singh Katoch, followed his father into the J&K State forces, where he was commissioned into the J&K Bodyguard Cavalry.

Notes

References

Bibliography
 
 
 
  

1872 births
1972 deaths
Chief Ministers of Jammu and Kashmir (princely state)
Companions of the Order of the Indian Empire
People from Kangra district
People of the 1947 Kashmir conflict